Tangla College, established in 1970, is a general degree undergraduate, coeducational college situated at Chamuapara in Tangla, Assam. This college is affiliated with the Gauhati University.

Departments

Science
Physics
Mathematics
Chemistry
Botany
Zoology
Computer Application
Statistics

Arts and Commerce
 Assamese
 Bengali
 English
 Bodo
History
Education
Economics
Philosophy
Political Science
Geography
Commerce
Management

References

External links
http://tanglacollege.org

Universities and colleges in Assam
Colleges affiliated to Gauhati University
Educational institutions established in 1970
1970 establishments in Assam